
Gmina Cedry Wielkie is a rural gmina (administrative district) in Gdańsk County, Pomeranian Voivodeship, in northern Poland.

Villages
Gmina Cedry Wielkie contains the villages and settlements of Błotnik, Cedry Małe, Cedry Wielkie, Długie Pole, Giemlice, Kiezmark, Koszwały, Leszkowy, Miłocin, Miłocin Drugi, Serowo, Stanisławowo, Szerzawa, Szewce Gdańskie, Trutnowy, Trzcinisko and Wocławy.

Neighbouring gminas
Gmina Cedry Wielkie is bordered by the city of Gdańsk and by the gminas of Ostaszewo, Pruszcz Gdański, Stegna and Suchy Dąb.

References
Polish official population figures 2006

Cedry Wielkie
Gdańsk County